A capitonym is a word that changes its meaning (and sometimes pronunciation) when it is capitalized; the capitalization usually applies due to one form being a proper noun or eponym. It is a portmanteau of the word capital with the suffix -onym. A capitonym is a form of homograph and – when the two forms are pronounced differently – is also a form of heteronym. In situations where both words should be capitalized (such as the beginning of a sentence), there will be nothing to distinguish between them except the context in which they are used.

Although some pairs, such as march and March, are completely unrelated, in other cases, such as august and catholic, the capitalized form is a name that is etymologically related to the uncapitalized form. For example, August derives from the name of Imperator Augustus, who named himself after the word augustus, whence English august came. Likewise, both Catholic and catholic derive from a Greek adjective meaning "universal".

Capital letters may be used to differentiate between a set of objects, and a particular example of that object. For instance in astronomical terminology a distinction may be drawn between a moon, any natural satellite, and the Moon, the natural satellite of Earth.

In English

Philosophical, religious, and political terms
A particular example of where capitonyms are prominent is in terminology relating to philosophy, religion, and politics. Capitalized words are often used to differentiate a philosophical concept from how the concept is referred to in everyday life, or to demonstrate respect for an entity or institution.

Words for transcendent ideas in the Platonic sense are often capitalized, especially when used in a religious context.  Examples include "Good", "Beauty", "Truth" or "the One".

The word "god" is capitalized to "God" when referring to the single deity of monotheistic religions such as Christianity, Judaism, or Islam, and common to capitalize pronouns related to God (He, Him, His, etc.) as well; this practice is followed by many versions of the Bible, such as the NKJV. In this tradition, possessive pronouns are also capitalized if one is quoting God; "My" and "Mine" are capitalized, which should not be done when a human speaks. The pronouns "You", "Your", and "Yours" are also sometimes capitalized in reference to God. Other distinctions sometimes made include church (meaning a building) and Church (meaning an organization or group of people), and the liturgical Mass, versus the physical mass.

As political parties are often named after philosophies, a capital letter is used to differentiate between a supporter of the philosophy, and a supporter of the party, for instance Liberal, a supporter of any Liberal Party, and liberal, a supporter of the philosophy of liberalism.  Terms such as "small-l liberal" may be used to indicate the concept that an individual supports.  Similar examples are conservative/Conservative, democrat/Democrat, libertarian/Libertarian, republican/Republican, socialist/Socialist, and a supporter of labour/Labour.

List of capitonyms in English
The following list includes only "dictionary words". Personal names (Mark/mark), place-names (China/china, Turkey/turkey), company names (Fiat/fiat), names of publications (Time/time) etc. are all excluded as too numerous to list. Adjectives distinct from placenames (e.g. Polish/polish) are allowed. Pairs in which one word is simply a secondary meaning of the other – e.g. Masonry (secret society), which is in essence a peculiar use of the word masonry (wall building) – are omitted.

Example in poetry 
The poem "Job's Job" from Richard Lederer's The Word Circus is an example of the use of capitonyms:

Other languages
In other languages there are more, or fewer, of these pairs depending on that language's capitalization rules. For example, in German, where all nouns are capitalized, there are many pairs such as Laut 'sound' ~ laut 'loud' or Morgen 'morning' ~ morgen 'tomorrow'. In contrast, in Italian, as well as Spanish, very few words (except proper names) are capitalized, so there are extremely few, if any, such pairs. An example in Spanish is Lima (city) ~ lima 'file (tool)' or 'lime (fruit)'. In Portuguese, an example is Peru (country) ~ peru 'turkey' (bird).

References

Semantics
Types of words
Word play
Homonymy
Capitalization